Maria Jane Hyde (born 1969) is an English singer and musical actress.

Early life
Hyde was born in 1969 in The Memorial Hospital in Shooters Hill, London, England. Her father, Edward Hyde, is a successful company founder (Copyforce), her mother is Maureen (née Fennelly). Hyde grew up with her two older brothers in various Boroughs of The City of London.

From the age of four, Hyde attended the Roman Catholic Saint Mary's Primary School. At age 10, she started her training at the Italia Conti Academy of Theatre Arts, Britain's oldest theatre school.

During her training, Hyde appeared in various musicals and productions, i.e. Annie (London/ England) as 'Pepper', in The Wizard of Oz (London/ England) as 'Munchkin/Dorothy' and the BBC Television production Grange Hill.

Career
In 1985, Hyde auditioned for a new type of musical at that time, the London production of Starlight Express. She was chosen by Sir Andrew Lloyd Webber and became first cast 'Pearl' in the following year, at the age of only 16.

In 1988, Hyde became the original 'Pearl' in Starlight Express Germany, the most successful musical in history.

In 2009, Maria Jane Hyde set up her own musical school - Starlight Musical Academy in Velbert, Germany.

Personal life
Hyde has a daughter. She currently lives in Velbert, Germany.

Engagements

Musical
 Annie (London, Victoria Palace), as Pepper
 Wizard of Oz (London, Ashcroft Theatre), as Munchkin/ Dorothy
 Cindarella (London, AdHoc Theatre Co.)
 1985–1988: Starlight Express (London/ England), 1st Cast Pearl
 1988–1997: Starlight Express (Bochum/ Germany), original Pearl
 2000–2001: Tabaluga & Lilli (Oberhausen/ Germany), alternate Lilli, 2nd Cast Spinnenfrau
 2002–2004: Miami Nights (Düsseldorf/ Germany), original Präsidentin, 2nd Cast Laura/ Mercedes

Tours
 Stella Entertainment, Asia-Tour, Soloist
 Welcome 2000, Europe-Tour, as Liza Minnelli
 Musical Nights (SET Musical Prod.), Germany-Tour, Soloist
 Musical Hautnah (Creativ Team Int.), Germany-Tour, Soloist
 Musicals in Concert (Rainbow Show Service), Germany-Tour, Over The Rainbow I, Soloist
 Musicals in Concert (Rainbow Show Service), Germany-Tour, Over The Rainbow II, Soloist

Other
 The Royal Variety Show (London, Palladium)
 BBC (London/ England), Grange Hill
 BBC (London/ England), The Ovaltineys
 diverse i.e. for: Opel GMC, Deutsche Bahn AG, Daimler-Chrysler, E-Plus, Vodafone-D2, Fijitsu-Siemens, Reemtsma, BMW, Michelin, Sparda-Bank, TNT, Sparkasse, Ferrari, Deutsche Post AG, Karstadt, Ideal Home Show

Recordings
 CD, "What are you waiting for", Maria Jane Hyde, 1991
 CD Starlight Express, Pearl, Original German Cast Recording
 CD, Kindle Park, Soloist, Kids Rock CD, Los Angeles.
 CD, The Medleys, Soloist, Creativ Team Int.
 CD, Big Brother Christmas, Session Singer, Sony/BMG
 CD, Miami Nights, Baila Me, Soloist, Original Cast Recording
 CD, United Music Nation, Soloist, Jabba Records

Gallery

References

External links
 Starlight Express Fanclub (German)
 StagePool Germany
 Starlight Musical Academy - Home

1969 births
Living people
English women singers
People from Shooter's Hill
English stage actresses
English female dancers
English musical theatre actresses
English expatriates in Germany
Musicians from Kent
Actresses from Kent